Sphaerodoridae is a family of polychaetes belonging to the order Phyllodocida.

Genera

Genera:
 Amocrodorum Kudenov, 1987
 Clavodorum Hartman & Fauchald, 1971

References

Phyllodocida